Minot station, built in 1912, now houses the Old Soo Depot Transportation Museum. It is located in historic Downtown Minot, North Dakota, USA. The depot once served the Minneapolis, St. Paul and Sault Ste. Marie Railroad, which is now part of the Canadian Pacific Railway.

It was listed on the National Register of Historic Places in 1978 as the Soo Line Passenger Depot.

Passenger train service to the Soo Line Minot station ended on December 9, 1963, when trains 13 and 14 were discontinued from the Twin Cities to Portal, North Dakota. Mixed train service continued for some time thereafter.

References

External links

Old Soo Depot Transportation Museum (Minot Convention & Visitors Bureau) 

Former Soo Line stations
Railway stations in the United States opened in 1912
Buildings and structures in Minot, North Dakota
Railway stations on the National Register of Historic Places in North Dakota
Museums in Minot, North Dakota
Railroad museums in North Dakota
1912 establishments in North Dakota
National Register of Historic Places in Ward County, North Dakota
Former railway stations in North Dakota
Transportation in Ward County, North Dakota
Railway stations closed in 1963